Ouyang is a Chinese surname. It is the most common two-character Chinese compound surname, being the only two-character name of the 400 most common Chinese surnames, according to a 2013 study, and is one of the few two-character surnames that have survived into modern times.

Etymology
歐陽 was spelled as :
 Chinese languages : Ouyang, Oyang, O Yang, O'Yang, Owyang, Au Yong, Auyong, Ah Yong, Auyang, Auyeung, Au Yeung, Au Yeang, Au Yeong, Au Ieong, Ao Ieong, Eoyang, Oyong, O'Young, Auwjong, Ojong, Owyong, Ou Young, Ow Yeong, Ow Young
 Vietnamese languages : An-dương · Arang · Orang · Urang (安陽, in ancient Annam), Âu-dương (in Northern), Âu-giương (in Central), Âu-dzương (in Southern), Âu-rương, Âu-lương, Âu-lang, Âu-giang
 Korean languages : 구양 (九陽, 固阳, Guyang)
 Japanese languages : おうよう (鷹揚 / Ōyō), オウヤン (株)
 Others : ㄡㄧㄤˊ (in Bopomofo)

History
The Song Dynasty historian Ouyang Xiu traced the Ouyang surname to Ti (pinyin: Tí), a prince of Yue, the second son of King Wujiang. After his state was extinguished by the state of Chu, Ti and his family lived in the south side of the Mount Ouyu (currently called Mount Sheng  in Huzhou, Zhejiang). In Classical Chinese, the south side of a mountain or the north bank of a river is called Yang, thus the Ti family was called Ouyang. He was called Marquis of Ouyang Village. Traditionally, Ti's ancestry can be traced through his father Wujiang, the King of Yue, to the semi-legendary Yu the Great.

According to a 2013 study, Ouyang was the 169th most common name in China, being shared by around 910000 people or 0.068% of the total population, with the province with the most people with the name being Hunan.

Geographical origins
In terms of distribution Ouyangs have mostly been confined to southern China, especially the areas of southern Jiangxi, central Hubei and eastern Henan, with smaller pockets in Guangdong, Sichuan, Hunan and Guangxi.

Notable clans
The most prominent of the Ouyang clans historically was undoubtedly that of Yongfeng in Jiangxi, which produced a number of scholars who reached prominence in the imperial bureaucracy. Genealogical lineages and family trees have been established for a number of Ouyang clans around China, showing migration patterns from the Song to the Qing dynasty.

In Vietnam, this clan was often shortcut as Âu (歐), Dương (阳) or Dương/Giàng (陽).

Notable people
Ouyang Feiying, 1930s Shanghai singer
Ouyang Feifei, Taiwanese-Japanese singer
Ouyang Nana, Taiwanese actress
Ouyang Xiadan, CCTV News reporter
Ouyang Xiu, Song dynasty scholar
Ouyang Xun, Tang dynasty scholar
Ouyang Zhan, Tang dynasty scholar
Ouyang Yibing, Chinese film scripter
Ouyang Ziyuan, Chinese cosmochemist and geochemist, chief scientist in charge of the Chinese Lunar Exploration Program
Âu Dương Quân, Vietnamese footballer of JMG Academy
Au Yeung Yiu Chung, Hong Kong footballer who won a 2009 East Asian Games gold medal
Bobby Au-yeung, Hong Kong actor
Susanna Au-yeung, Hong Kong actress and acupuncturist
Stephen Oyoung, Chinese-American actor
Jimmy O. Yang, born Au-yeung Man-Sing, Chinese-American stand-up comedian and actor
MC Jin, born Jin Au-Yeung, hip-hop artist 
Myra Sidharta, born Auwjong Tjhoen Moy, Indonesian historian
Darryl O'Young, Chinese name Au-Yeung Ruoxi, Canadian-born Hong Kong racing driver
Petrus Kanisius Ojong, born Auwjong Peng Koen, co-founder of Indonesian newspaper Kompas
Ouyang,Francis, Chief of Hospital Medicine VA Medical Center, United States.
Pearl AuYeung, Hong Kong Children's book author-illustrator

Culture
By Vietnamese scholars, 歐陽 may be an origin of words văn-lang (minang / 文郎), mê-linh (maleng / 麊泠), âu-lạc (urang, orang, anak / 甌雒, 甌駱) and an-dương (arang / 安陽) what means "people" or "country" in ancient Tai and Malayo-Polynesian languages.

 Malayo-Polynesian languages : Anak
 Muong languages : Rú rác (in ancient), nú nác (in modern)
 Vietic languages : Núi nước (in ancient), đất nước (in modern)

See also
 Văn Lang
 Âu Lạc

References

Yue (state)
Chinese-language surnames
Individual Chinese surnames